Andrea Oliveri (Palermo 14 January 2003) is an Italian footballer who plays as a right midfielder for  club Frosinone on loan from Atalanta.

Club career
Oliveri was first called up to the senior squad of Atalanta in October 2021.

On 11 August 2022, Oliveri joined Frosinone in Serie B on loan. He made his Serie B debut for Frosinone on 21 August 2022 in a game against Brescia.

International career
Oliveri was first called up to represent his country for Under-15 squad friendlies in February 2018. He was later called up to the Under-16 and Under-17 squads as well, also for friendlies.

References

External links
 

2003 births
Footballers from Palermo
Living people
Italian footballers
Italy youth international footballers
Association football midfielders
Serie B players
Atalanta B.C. players
Frosinone Calcio players